NGC 6210 is a planetary nebula located  in the constellation Hercules, approximately  from the Sun. This object was first recorded as a star-like feature by Joseph Lalande on March 22, 1799. However, credit for the discovery of a nebula goes to Wilhelm Struve in 1825. John L. E. Dreyer described it as, "a planetary nebula, very bright, very small, round, disc and border".

This nebula is "very amorphous and irregular" in shape, but forms a rough ellipsoid. It consists of two parts; a bright inner region filled with arches and filaments spanning , and a larger and fainter outer volume that has a pair of "tubular" structures. The inner region has an expansion velocity ranging over 19–24 km/s. The emission from the outer part of the nebula is only about 1% of the total.

The central star has an apparent visual magnitude of 12.66 and the spectrum matches a hydrogen-rich star of type O(H). The abundances of the nebula suggest a low initial mass for the central star, probably . There appears to be a collaminated jet feature to the northwest, suggesting the central star is ejecting material along two and possibly four such directions.

Gallery

References

External links

HubbleSite NewsCenter Hubble picture and information on NGC 6210
 http://freestarcharts.com/constellations?catid=7&id=1:hercules-constellation-guide

Planetary nebulae
6210
Hercules (constellation)